The Norway women's national beach handball team is the national team of Norway. It is governed by the Norwegian Handball Federation and it represents Norway in international beach handball competitions.

Results
Norway was the bronze medal team at the 2007 European Beach Handball Championship, where Linn Jørum Sulland finished as top scorer and Ingrid Ødegård was named Best Goalkeeper.

In 2009 they played in the final of the European tournament, but lost to Italy after an even shootout and a golden goal in front of a home audience in Larvik. Line player Ane Brustuen was awarded Best Player of the women's tournament.

They received their first gold medal in 2010, at the 2010 World Championship in Antalya, Turkey. Ane Brustuen was named MVP of the tournament.

They made bronze at the 2012, 2014 and 2016 world championships.

World Championships

World Games

Controversy
In 2021 the team received international media attention after they were fined 1,500 euros by the European Handball Federation for choosing to wear shorts instead of the mandated bikini bottoms for female players during a bronze medal match against Spain in Bulgaria. Many media figures and social media users called the fine and the mandated bikini rule sexist with many pointing out the hypocrisy that the male teams are allowed to wear the same type of shorts that the females wore at that match. 

Norway's minister for culture and sport Abid Raja described the fine as being "completely ridiculous". Former tennis champion Billie Jean King supported the team tweeting "The sexualisation of women athletes must stop". Pop star Pink offered to pay the fine for the team.

References

External links
Official website
IHF profile

Beach handball
Women's national beach handball teams